John Barnett (1802–1890) was an English composer.

John Barnett may also refer to:

John Barnett (Australian rules footballer) (born 1975), former Australian rules footballer
John Barnett (rugby) (1880–1918), Australian rugby union and rugby league player
John Francis Barnett (1837–1916), English music composer and teacher
John Davis Barnett (1848–1926), early Canadian curator-librarian
Jack Barnett (baseball) (1879–1923), baseball player
John Maughan Barnett (1867–1938), New Zealand organist, choirmaster and conductor
John W. Barnett (1800–1876), Texas farmer, merchant and community leader
John Manley Barnett (1917–2013), American conductor

See also
John Barnet (died 1373), English bishop